The Mountain Xpress is an alternative newspaper covering news, arts, local politics, and events in Asheville and western North Carolina, USA. Published each Wednesday in print and online, it has a print circulation of about 29,000. The Mountain Xpress is one of 130 member newspapers of the Association of Alternative Newsweeklies.

Mission statement
The newspaper's mission is "To build community and strengthen democracy by serving an active, thoughtful readership at the local level – where the impact of citizen action is greatest".

Weekly features
 Opinion & Letters, with regular cartoons by Randy Molton & Brent Brown
 News (covering Buncombe County Commission, Asheville City Council and other local issues)
 Asheville Archives (pictures and stories from Asheville's history, often related to issues in today's headlines)
 Community Calendar, listing events held by nonprofits and/or noncommercial venues around Western North Carolina
 Wellness (health news)
 Green Scene (environmental-news feature)
 Farm & Garden (local happenings and trends to watch for growers) 
 Food (covering restaurant, food & beverage news — including "Small Bites" short stories)
 Carolina Beer Guy (local beer & brewery news)
 Arts & Entertainment (music & art news — including "Smart Bets" short stories)
 Clubland (live music listings around Western North Carolina)
 Movie Reviews (movie reviews from diverse reviewers, hosted by the Asheville Movie Guys) 
 Marketplace (classifieds, personals & astrology)
Online-only features include:
 Acoustic Asheville (acoustic exclusive music videos)
 30 Days Out (concerts coming up in the next month)
 Album reviews (a local take on local music releases)

Best of WNC
The Xpress publishes an annual "Best of WNC" listing the best restaurants, businesses and activities in the Asheville area, based on a readers' poll.

Other Xpress guides to the area include Asheville Eats & Drinks, Give!Local guide to accessible philanthropy, Go Local Guide to discounts at local businesses, Nonprofit supplements, Women in Business supplements and Beer Fest.

Footnotes

External links

Alternative weekly newspapers published in the United States
Mass media in Asheville, North Carolina
Weekly newspapers published in North Carolina